Discolampa is a genus of butterflies in the family Lycaenidae. The genus ranges from Sri Lanka to New Guinea.

Species
Discolampa albula (Grose-Smith, 1897) West Irian (New Guinea)
Discolampa ethion (Westwood, 1851) 
Discolampa ilissus (C. & R. Felder, 1859) Sulawesi

External links
Funet Taxonomy
Images representing Discolampa  at Bold

 
Lycaenidae genera
Taxa named by Lambertus Johannes Toxopeus